Higham (also Hayem, Heyem, Hyam, Hyams, Hyman, and others) is a surname with two possible origins. The first is the name based on geographical locations in England, see Higham, and was originally for people from those locations. The second is from the Hebrew word "khayim" which means life.

People with the surname Higham
Alice Higham, saint
Charles Higham (biographer) (1931–2012), biographer and poet
Charles Higham (archaeologist)
Sir Clement Higham, Knight, of Barrow Hall
Darrel Higham rockabilly guitarist
Prof Desmond Higham FRSE, mathematician
Dick Higham, a baseball player, but remembered as a dishonest umpire.
Edward Higham, Australian politician.
Frank Higham, English footballer
 James Higham, Idaho Potato Commissioner
Jennifer Higham, British actress
John Higham (historian), American historian
John Higham (Australian politician), Australian politician
John Sharp Higham, British politician
Mickey Higham, English rugby league player
Prof Nicholas Higham (Nicholas John Higham), FRS, British mathematician, University of Manchester
Prof N. J. Higham (Nicholas John Higham), British medieval historian, University of Manchester
Nick Higham (Nicholas Geoffrey Higham), BBC Reporter
Ruth Higham, model
Scott Higham, United States journalist
Tim Higham, also known as Tim FitzHigham FRSA, FRGS, actor, author and explorer
Tom Higham (disambiguation), several people

People with the surname Hyam
Barry Hyam (born 1975), English cricketer
Dominic Hyam (born 1995), Scottish footballer 
Luke Hyam (born 1991), English footballer
Solomon Hyam (1837–1901), Australian politician
Stephanie Hyam, British actress
Peter Chapple-Hyam (born 1963), English racehorse trainer

See also
Higham (disambiguation)
Haim or Chaim, given name & surname (includes people with Hyam as a given name)
Heigham
Hyams

References

Hebrew-language names
English-language surnames
English toponymic surnames